Naas Presbyterian Church is a Presbyterian church in Naas, Ireland.

Architecture
The building is a four-bay structure. The use of limestone, granite and brick create a polychrome brickwork effect, popular at the time.

History
The church was built in 1868 on the site of the former tholsel, John La Touche of Harristown laying the foundation stone. Rose La Touche worshipped there in 1872.

In 1916, a Boyle's patented air-pump ventilator was installed.

References

Presbyterian churches in the Republic of Ireland
19th-century Presbyterian churches
Churches completed in 1868
1868 establishments in Ireland
19th-century churches in the Republic of Ireland